Alexandra Hills is a residential locality in the City of Redland, Queensland, Australia.

Geography 
Alexandra Hills sits between two major areas of Redlands, with Cleveland to the east and Capalaba to the west. Alexandra Hills itself is notable as the only enclaved suburb of the largely coastal Redland City.

Finucane Crossing is near the western edge of locality. It is near where  Finucane Road crosses Hilliards Creek into neighbouring Ormiston and Cleveland.

History 
Alexandra Hills State School opened on 28 January 1975.

St Anthony's Catholic Primary School opened on 1 January 1980 on a  site purchased by the Archdiocese of Brisbane. The school opened with 157 students under the leadership of Presentation Sister Kieran McNamara. Archbishop Francis Rush blessed and officially blessed the school on Sunday 9 March 1980.

Vienna Woods State School opened on 29 January 1985.

Alexandra Hills State High School opened on 27 January 1987.

Hilliard State School opened on 29 January 1991.

The Anglican Church of the Resurrection was dedicated in 1991 and consecrated in 2010.

The median age of the Alexandra Hills population was 35 years, 2 years below the national median of 37.  77% of people living in Alexandra Hills were born in Australia. The other top responses for country of birth were New Zealand 5.8%, England 4.3%, South Africa 0.9%, Philippines 0.8%, Scotland 0.7%.  91.3% of people spoke only English at home; the next most common languages were 0.4% German, 0.3% Polish, 0.3% Filipino, 0.3% Italian, 0.3% Spanish.

The Sycamore School opened in 2017 to provide special education for children with autism.

Education
Alexandra Hills State School is a government primary (Prep-6) school for boys and girls at 12 Princeton Avenue. In 2018, the school had an enrolment of 199 students with 24 teachers (15 full-time equivalent) and 31 non-teaching staff (22 full-time equivalent). It includes a special education program.

Vienna Woods State School is a government primary (Prep-6) school for boys and girls at 12 Heffernan Road. In 2018, the school had an enrolment of 253 students with 25 teachers (19 full-time equivalent) and 17 non-teaching staff (11 full-time equivalent). It includes a special education program.

Hilliard State School is a government primary (Prep-6) school for boys and girls at Cnr Alexandra Circuit & Hanover Drive. In 2018, the school had an enrolment of 733 students with 55 teachers (47 full-time equivalent) and 30 non-teaching staff (20 full-time equivalent). It includes a special education program.

St Anthony's School is a Catholic primary (Prep-6) school for boys and girls at St Anthony's Drive. In 2018, the school had an enrolment of 477 students with 35 teachers (32 full-time equivalent) and 27 non-teaching staff (14 full-time equivalent).

The Sycamore School is a private primary (Prep-6) school for boys and girls with autism on the Alexandra Hills TAFE Campus at 29 Windemere Road. In 2018, the school had an enrolment of 62 students with 11 teachers (10 full-time equivalent) and 18 non-teaching staff (15 full-time equivalent).

Alexandra Hills State High School is a government secondary (7-12) school for boys and girls at Windemere Road. In 2018, the school had an enrolment of 1457 students with 123 teachers (116 full-time equivalent) and 60 non-teaching staff (44 full-time equivalent). It includes a special education program. The school is the home of 136 Army Cadet Unit - City of Redlands. Until 2010, it was the largest school in the City of Redland but rapid growth of enrolments at Cleveland District State High School have put Alexandra Hills into 2nd place since 2011.

The Alexandra Hills Campus of the Metropolitan South Institute of TAFE is in Windermere Street and is adjacent to Alexandra Hills State High School.

Amenities 
The Redland City Council operates a mobile library service which visits the Bluebell Street Shops.

The Anglican Church of the Resurrection is at 48 Newhaven Street (corner Windermere Street).

Alexandra Hills is home to the popular McGuire's owned venue 'The Alexandra Hills Hotel' or colloquially known as 'The Alex'. The hotel is situated on the outer edges of Alexandra Hills almost bordering nearby suburbs Wellington Point and Cleveland. The hotel is also home to the 'Squeeze Club', a weekend nightclub commonly referred to as 'The Pit'. It is located on the top level of the Hotel.

Parks, bushland and recreation

Windemere Road Park
Coolwinpin Creek
Valantine Park
Community Centre
Keith Surridge Oval
Hanover Drive Park
George Street Park

Windemere Road Park is the most developed park in Alexandra Hills. The most recent addition has been a climbing wall. It also hosts a flying fox, skate/bike bowl, basketball court and an off the leash area for dogs. The park itself stretches from Windemere Road to Cumberland Drive.

The George Street and Hanover Drive Parks also have dog offleash areas and there is a trial area in Valantine Park.

Sporting Clubs 
Alexandra Hills Bombers Australian Rules Football Club
Alexandra Hills Cricket Club
Meteors Netball Club

References

External links

 

Suburbs of Redland City
Localities in Queensland